Always Goodbye is a 1931 American pre-Code drama film directed by Kenneth MacKenna and William Cameron Menzies and starring Elissa Landi, Lewis Stone and Paul Cavanagh. It was produced and distributed by Fox Film.

Synopsis
In London a con man and a former heiress join forces to try and cheat a millionaire at his Italian villa.

Cast
 Elissa Landi as Lila Banning  
 Lewis Stone as John Graham  
 Paul Cavanagh as Reginald Armstrong, alias of Morgan  
 John Garrick as Cyril Shayne  
 Frederick Kerr as Sir George Boomer  
 Lumsden Hare as Blake  
 Herbert Bunston as Merson 
 Frank Atkinson as Servant  
 Mischa Auer as Mechanic  
 Louise Carver as Tenant in Hallway  
 Albert Conti as Party Gossip  
 Gino Corrado as Italian Policeman  
 Mary Gordon as Mrs. MacPherson, Moviegoer  
 Inez Palange as Italian Maid  
 Douglas Walton as Party Gossip

References

Bibliography
 Solomon, Aubrey. The Fox Film Corporation, 1915-1935. A History and Filmography. McFarland & Co, 2011.

External links
 

1931 films
1931 drama films
American drama films
Films directed by William Cameron Menzies
Films directed by Kenneth MacKenna
American black-and-white films
Fox Film films
Films set in London
Films set in Italy
1930s English-language films
1930s American films